Serindere is a village in the Yüksekova District of Hakkâri Province in Turkey. The village is populated by Kurds of the Mamxuran tribe and had a population of 371 in 2021.

The hamlets of Miranava and Yukarıgüveç are attached to Serindere.

References 

Villages in Yüksekova District
Kurdish settlements in Hakkâri Province